Stephen Cooper is a paralympic athlete from Great Britain competing mainly in category T38 middle-distance events.

Stephen competed in the 2000 Summer Paralympics where he won a bronze medal in the T38 800m and a silver medal as part of the  team.  Four years later he returned to the 2004 games where he was unable to medal in his only event, the 800m.

References

Paralympic athletes of Great Britain
Athletes (track and field) at the 2000 Summer Paralympics
Athletes (track and field) at the 2004 Summer Paralympics
Paralympic silver medalists for Great Britain
Paralympic bronze medalists for Great Britain
Year of birth missing (living people)
Living people
Medalists at the 2000 Summer Paralympics
Paralympic medalists in athletics (track and field)
British male sprinters
British male middle-distance runners